In United States network television programming, a hiatus is a break of several weeks, months or years in the normal broadcast programming of a television series. Such a break can occur part-way through the season of a series, in which case it is also called a mid-season break, or between distinct television seasons (usually starting in June and ending in September, when shooting starts for the next season). In the Northern Hemisphere, the breaks between late November and early February are also referred to as winter breaks or, in the Christian cultural sphere, Christmas breaks.

Until the late 1990s, summer breaks were sometimes replaced by summer replacement series.

Planned hiatus
Most broadcast network television series are scheduled for a season of 22 episodes in a time span running 36 weeks from September to May, so networks usually arrange the 22 episodes to air in blocks. Television stations often implement a hiatus for their programs to split up a season for storyline purposes. Some programs also go on hiatus so that their television networks can reserve episodes for airing during the three major ratings sweeps periods, wherein networks compute their television advertising fees based on their programs' ratings during that period. Programs return from a hiatus in time for the sweeps period so as to generate high ratings, and as such usually include special content in programming such as guest stars, controversial and unexpected plots or topics, extended episodes, and finales. Television programs tend to have a hiatus for the late-November, throughout December and early January holidays or the summer if the season does not end before, resuming at some point after, most often early February in the case of Christmas and New Year, and September in the case of the summer.

In the United States, hiatuses may also be common during major sporting events - currently Major League Baseball playoffs in October for Fox, the Olympic Winter Games in February quadrennially on NBC, and the NCAA Division I men's basketball tournament in March for CBS, and for Sunday programs, throughout the winter awards season. The American mid-season break usually starts at Thanksgiving in late-November, sometimes ending with a Thanksgiving or Christmas episode, and lasts until the Super Bowl the first Sunday in February.

The final episode airing before the Christmas break is usually referred to as the midseason finale, or in the northern hemisphere, "winter finale".

At this time, other TV series may be launched, often a filler short series between seasons to ensure the 22-episode run will conclude in May.

Cancellation

A network may put a show on hiatus before canceling it. This may be to evaluate the series' quality, warn the television producers in an effort to push them to produce a more profitable product, fill its timeslot with another program to compare ratings, or warn viewers that the show is not pulling its weight in ratings to see how the show performs in reruns before deciding whether or not it deserves another season. 

In some cases, this is due to creative differences. ABC dealt with such a situation in the mid-1980s with their Tuesday night dramedy Moonlighting on three fronts, including actor Bruce Willis's growing disinterest in the series due to his budding film career, Cybill Shepherd unable to handle the overwhelming workload of the series, and overlong scripts and overbearing production demands from series creator/writer/showrunner Glenn Gordon Caron. The series was never able to fulfill a full series run in its five seasons and had multiple production hiatuses, to the network's constant consternation.

Other reasons
A series may be put on hiatus for other reasons. The 2007–2008 Writers Guild of America strike forced several television series (including Pushing Daisies, Eli Stone, Chuck, The Big Bang Theory, and Heroes) to go into un-planned hiatus and deferred the scheduled returns of other series such as 24 for an extended period. A show may go on hiatus in reaction to its content: The Pokémon anime was put on hiatus in Japan from December 17, 1997 until April 16, 1998 after the airing of an episode which caused 685 viewers to have seizures. A show may also be put on hiatus due to personal issues with a cast member, or an illness or death: examples are the death of 8 Simple Rules actor John Ritter; The Royal Family being retooled after the death of Redd Foxx; and Sonny with a Chance actress Demi Lovato departing Disney Channel to deal with personal issues, leading to that show's retooling around the show within a show So Random!.

In 2020, that year's coronavirus pandemic had an inordinate and worldwide impact on the entirety of the television industry, effectively forcing a number of programs across all genres to go on hiatus or end their seasons early due to public health concerns and public gathering prohibitions.

See also
 Hiatus (production): the annual halt-of-production of most television series and movies.

References

External links

Current US Shows on Hiatus or Discontinued (updates regularly)

Television terminology